Bergens Kreditbank was a Norwegian commercial bank based in Bergen. It was established in 1928 with its main offices in Vågsallmenningen. It merged with Bergens Privatbank in 1975 to establish Bergen Bank.

References

Defunct banks of Norway
Companies based in Bergen
1975 disestablishments in Norway
Banks established in 1928
Banks disestablished in 1975
Norwegian companies established in 1928